Lough Derg is the name of two lakes in Ireland:
 Lough Derg (Shannon) a large lake on the River Shannon, bordering counties Clare, Galway and Tipperary
 Lough Derg, County Donegal a small lake, a place of Christian pilgrimage

See also
 Lough Derg Way, a long-distance trail in Ireland